How Do You Feel may refer to:

How Do You Feel?, a 2014 EP by Joywave
"How Do Ya Feel", a song by Five from their 1999 album Invincible